The United States competed at the 1928 Winter Olympics in St. Moritz, Switzerland.

Medalists 

The following U.S. competitors won medals at the games. In the by discipline sections below, medalists' names are bolded. 

| width="78%" align="left" valign="top" |

| width=22% align=left valign=top |

Bobsleigh

Cross-country skiing

Figure skating

Individual

Mixed

Nordic combined 

The cross-country skiing part of this event was combined with the 18 km race of cross-country skiing. Those results can be found above in this article in the cross-country skiing section. Some athletes (but not all) entered in both the cross-country skiing and Nordic combined event, their time on the 18 km was used for both events. One would expect that athletes competing at the Nordic combined event, would participate in the cross-country skiing event as well, as they would have the opportunity to win more than one medal. This was not always the case due to the maximum number of athletes that could represent a country per event.

The ski jumping (normal hill) event was held separate from the main medal event of ski jumping, results can be found in the table below.

Skeleton

Ski jumping

Speed skating

In the 10,000-meter speed skating race, Irving Jaffee was leading the competition, having outskated Norwegian defending world champion Bernt Evensen in their heat, when rising temperatures thawed the ice.  In a controversial ruling, the Norwegian referee canceled the entire competition. Although the International Olympic Committee reversed the referee's decision and awarded Jaffee the gold medal, the International Skating Union later overruled the IOC and restored the ruling. Evensen, for his part, publicly said that Jaffee should be awarded the gold medal, but that never happened.

References

 Olympic Winter Games 1928, full results by sports-reference.com

Nations at the 1928 Winter Olympics
1928
Olympics, Winter